Khukumoni Home Delivery is an Indian Bengali Language Drama television series which premiered on 1 November 2021 on Bengali entertainment channel Star Jalsha. It is also available on the online streaming platform Disney+ Hotstar. This show is produced by Snehasish Chakraborty under the banner of Blues Productions. It stars Dipanwita Rakshit and Rahul Mazumdar.

Plot 
Khukumoni Home Delivery shows the struggle of an orphan girl who delivers foods from home to home. It also shows the story of a mentally unstable person who loves music.

Cast

Main 
 Dipanwita Rakshit as Khukumoni Das Deb – A home delivery agent; Bihan's wife (2021-2022) 
 Rahul Mazumdar as Bihan Deb – Bhisma and Ivana's son; Nipa's step-son; Palash, Shree and Biyas's half-brother; Khukumoni's husband (2021-2022)

Recurring 
 Dipankar De as Ashutosh Deb – Mohitosh and Basudha's brother; Bhisma, Bhaskar and Papiya's father; Bihan, Palash, Shree and Biyas's grandfather (2021-2022) 
 Kanchana Moitra as Nipa Deb – Bhisma's second wife; Palash, Shree and Biyas's mother; Bihan's step-mother (2021-2022) 
 Biplab Banerjee as Bhisma Deb – Ashutosh's elder son; Bhaskar and Papiya's brother; Ivana and Nipa's husband; Bihan, Palash, Shree and Biyas's father (2021-2022) 
 Lopamudra Sinha as Ivana Deb – Bhisma's first wife; Bihan's mother (deceased) (2021) 
 Soma Dey as Basudha Chowdhury – Ashutosh and Mohitosh's sister; Bhisma and Bhaskar's aunt (2021-2022) 
 Gourab Ghosal as Palash Deb – Bhisma and Nipa's elder son; Shree and Biyas's brother; Bihan's half-brother; Kriti's husband  (2021-2022) 
 Prarona Bhattacharya as Kriti Deb – Palash's wife (2021-2022) 
 Sreemoyee Chattoraj as Shree Deb – Bhisma and Nipa's daughter; Palash and Biyas's sister; Bihan's half-sister (2021-2022) 
 Manishankar Banerjee as Mohitosh Deb – Ashutosh and Basudha's brother; Hema's husband (2021) 
 Tapasi Roychowdhury as Hema Deb – Mohitosh's wife (2021) 
 Arpita Dutta Chowdhury as Papiya Deb – Ashutosh's daughter; Bisma and Bhaskar's sister (2021-2022) 
 Mitali Bhattacharya as Papri Deb – Ashutosh's niece (2021-2022) 
 Sankar Sanku Chakraborty as Bhaskar Deb – Ashutosh's younger son; Bhisma and Papiya's brother; Kangana's husband (2021-2022) 
 Rii Sen as Kangana Deb – Bhaskar's wife (2021-2022) 
 Srabanti Malakar as Khukumoni's aunt (2021-2022) 
 Nayanika Sarkar as Nayana – Bihan's fiancé (2021-2022)

Reception

TRP Ratings

Adaptations

References

External links 
 Khukumoni Home Delivery at Disney+ Hotstar

Bengali-language television programming in India
2021 Indian television series debuts
2022 Indian television series endings
Star Jalsha original programming
Indian drama television series